Meng Enyuan (1856–1933) was a Chinese general of the late Qing and early Republican period in China. A native of Tianjin, in what was then the province of Zhili, Meng was commander of the Chinese army garrison in Jilin province before being forced out by Wu Junsheng and Zhang Zuolin. He later allied with Wu Peifu and the Zhili clique against Zhang's Fengtian clique in the First Zhili-Fengtian War.

1856 births
1933 deaths
Republic of China warlords from Tianjin
Empire of China (1915–1916)